The 2009 Challenger Ciudad de Guayaquil was a professional tennis tournament played on outdoor red clay courts. It was the fifth edition of the tournament which was part of the 2009 ATP Challenger Tour. It took place in Guayaquil, Ecuador between 9 and 15 November 2009.

Sebastián Decoud and Santiago Giraldo were the defending champions, but Giraldo competed only in singles.
Decoud chose to start with Eduardo Schwank. They withdrew before match against Júlio César Campozano and Emilio Gómez in the quarterfinal.
Campozano and Gómez, who received a Wild Card into the doubles draw, won this tournament. They defeated Andreas Haider-Maurer and Lars Pörschke 6–7(2), 6–3, [10–8] in the final.

Seeds

Draw

Draw

References
 Doubles Draw

Challenger Ciudad de Guayaquil - Doubles
2009 Doubles